Clement Comly, IV (December 31, 1954 – August 6, 2014) was a baseball researcher, author and statistician.

Personal life
Comly earned a Bachelor of Science degree in Chemical Engineering and a master's degree in Business Administration from the University of Pennsylvania. He died in Wallingford, Pennsylvania.

Baseball work
He served as the Vice President of Retrosheet from 2004 to 2013 and did extensive data entry work for the organization.

He co-authored numerous books, including The Year of Blue Snow: The 1964 Philadelphia Phillies, Sweet '60: The 1960 Pittsburgh Pirates and The Miracle Braves of 1914: Boston's Original Worst-to-First World Series Champions.

He was a member of the Society for American Baseball Research, joining in 1982 and serving as co-chair of the Statistical Analysis Committee.

He also did statistical work for MLB.com.

His work has been used and cited by many publications.

References

1954 births
2014 deaths
American male writers
American statisticians
University of Pennsylvania School of Engineering and Applied Science alumni
Place of birth missing
Wharton School of the University of Pennsylvania alumni